Multiply Additions is a 2006 album by Jamie Lidell on Warp Records. It is largely made up of live performances and remixes of songs drawn from Lidell's 2005 album, Multiply.

Track listing
Songs written by Jamie Lidell and Dominic Salole (except as noted)
"You Got Me Up" (Live at the Scala) - 4:19 (Lidell)
"Multiply (In a Minor Key)" - 4:30
"When I Come Back Around" (Freeform Reform) - 5:45
"The City" (Four Tet Mix) - 5:02 (Lidell)
"A Little Bit More" (Luke Vibert Mix) - 5:29
"What's the Use" (Mocky Remix) - 3:18 (Lidell)
"Game for Fools" (Live In Paris) - 4:49
"Multiply" (Herbert's Hoedown Bump Instrumental) - 4:31
"A Little Bit More" (Herbert - A Little Bit Less Remix) - 5:15 (Lidell)
"Game for Fools" (Mara Carlyle Ukulady Mix) - 3:49

Notes
Track 1 performed live by Lidell, Gonzales, Mocky, Snax and Taylor Savvy
Track 2: Piano by Gonzales
Track 3 remixed by Anu Pillai
Track 4 remixed by Four Tet
Track 5 remixed by Luke Vibert
Track 6 remixed by Mocky, with Andre Vida (flute)
Track 7 performed live by Lidell, Feist, Gonzales & Mocky
Tracks 8 and 9 remixed by Matthew Herbert
Track 10 performed by Mara Carlyle (vocals & ukulele) with Dave Okumu (bass) and Ebony McKenzie-Dean (vocals)

Warp (record label) albums
2006 albums
Jamie Lidell albums